Gabriela Mistral University is a privately funded university in Santiago, Chile.

External links
 Gabriela Mistral University Indicators
 http://www.ugm.cl

1981 establishments in Chile
Gabriela